The Berlin Requiem is a 1928 composition for tenor, baritone, and choir of three male voices and orchestra by Kurt Weill to poems by Bertolt Brecht. The work had been commissioned by the  who intended to broadcast the work on all its stations. However Brecht failed to abide by his contractual obligation to show the poems to the commissioning body for advance approval and the content, some of it a memorial to Rosa Luxemburg, led to several stations banning the performance.

Weill took a commission from Radio Frankfurt, producing the Berlin Requiem based on some of Brecht's poems. A specific theme of the chosen texts is the forgotten dead, "faceless war casualties, or victims of violent crime whose bodies are disposed of in an undetected location", according to one writer. Some of the musical portion is quite spartan, with, for example, much of "" accompanied solely by guitar.

Movements
  (Great Chorale of Thanksgiving)
  (Ballad of the Drowned Girl)
  (memorial tablet)
 (alternate to 3)  (Gravestone 1919)
  (First Report on the Unknown Soldier)
  (Second Report on the Unknown Soldier)
  (To Potsdam under the Oak Trees)
Source: AllMusic

References

Works by Bertolt Brecht
Compositions by Kurt Weill
1928 poems
1928 compositions
Requiems